Oriol Ripol (born 6 September 1975, in Catalonia) is a rugby union player from Barcelona.
He previously played for Rotherham, Northampton, Worcester Warriors (whom he left in 2011.) and Sale Sharks, and has represented the Barbarians. In the 2005–2006 season, Ripol started the final and scored a try as Sale Sharks won their first ever Premiership title.

Honours
 2011 RFU Championship Champion with Worcester Warriors.
 2006 Premiership Champion with Sale Sharks.
 2005 European Challenge Cup with Sale Sharks.
 2003 Middlesex 7's Champion with Northampton Saints.
 2002 Powergen Shield Champion with Rotherham Titans.
 2001 National Division 1 Champion with Rotherham Titans.

References

External links
 Oriol Ripol Official Website
 Sale Sharks profile
 Stats on statbunker.com
 Scrum profile

1975 births
Barbarian F.C. players
Bridgend RFC players
Rugby union players from Catalonia
Living people
Northampton Saints players
Rotherham Titans players
Rugby union wings
Sale Sharks players
Spain international rugby union players
Spanish rugby union players
Sportspeople from Barcelona
Spanish expatriate rugby union players
Expatriate rugby union players in England
Expatriate rugby union players in Wales
Expatriate rugby union players in Italy
Spanish expatriate sportspeople in England
Spanish expatriate sportspeople in France
Spanish expatriate sportspeople in Italy
Barcelona UC players
UE Santboiana players